Jorge Carlos Carranza (born 7 May 1981) is an Argentine professional footballer who plays as a goalkeeper for Instituto.

Career statistics

Club
.

Honours
Instituto
Primera B Nacional: 2003–04

References

External links 
 
 
 
 
 

1981 births
Living people
Argentine footballers
Argentine expatriate footballers
Rivadavia de Lincoln footballers
Atlético de Rafaela footballers
Ferro Carril Oeste footballers
Godoy Cruz Antonio Tomba footballers
Instituto footballers
O'Higgins F.C. footballers
Olimpo footballers
San Martín de Tucumán footballers
Correcaminos UAT footballers
Club Atlético Colón footballers
Boca Unidos footballers
Chilean Primera División players
Argentine Primera División players
Primera Nacional players
Torneo Federal A players
Association football goalkeepers
Argentine expatriate sportspeople in Chile
Argentine expatriate sportspeople in Mexico
Expatriate footballers in Chile
Expatriate footballers in Mexico